Colombino (Spanish for Columbian and related to Christopher Columbus) may refer to:

 "Colombino" (song), by Connie Francis
 Codex Colombino, Mixtec codex
 Estadio Colombino, football stadium in Huelva, Spain (1957–2001)
 Estadio Nuevo Colombino, football stadium in Huelva, Spain (2001–present)
 Trofeo Colombino, football tournament in Huelva, Spain
 Terri Colombino (born 1975), American actress

See also

 
 Voto colombino
 Lugares colombinos
 Pleitos colombinos
 Colombine (disambiguation)
 Colombina (disambiguation)
 Colombian (disambiguation)
 Colombiana (disambiguation)
 Colombia (disambiguation)
 Columbine (disambiguation)
 Columbina (disambiguation)
 Columbian (disambiguation)
 Columbiana (disambiguation)
 Columbiad (disambiguation)
 Columbia (disambiguation)